The Battle of Mrzygłód took place on March 1, 1863 near the village of Mrzygłód (now a district of Myszków), Russian-controlled Congress Poland. It was one of many skirmishes of the January Uprising, the anti-Russian rebellion of Poles. The battle resulted in Polish victory.

After a skirmish near the village of Panki, a party of Polish insurgents under Teodor Cieszkowski came to Mrzygłód, on February 28, 1863. The Russians, tipped by their informers, transferred here a unit of the Imperial Russian Army, which arrived at Mrzygłód by the Warsaw–Vienna railway. After two attacks, which were repulsed by the insurgents, Russian forces decided to withdraw towards Częstochowa, as their rear was exposed to another local insurgent unit.

On March 1, 1933, the 70th anniversary of the skirmish, a monument dedicated to the uprising was unveiled at the market square in Mrzygłód.

Sources 
 Stefan Kieniewicz: Powstanie styczniowe. Warszawa: Państwowe Wydawnictwo Naukowe, 1983. .

Conflicts in 1863
1863 in Poland
Mrzyglod
March 1863 events